The Roggenhorn is a mountain of the Swiss Silvretta Alps, located east of Klosters in the canton of Graubünden. It lies between the valleys of Verstancla and Vernela, west of the Verstanclahorn.

References

External links
 Roggenhorn on Hikr

Mountains of the Alps
Mountains of Graubünden
Mountains of Switzerland
Klosters-Serneus